Eli B. Ames (August 3, 1820 – February 12, 1897) was a lawyer, postmaster, judge, and Democratic politician who served as the fourth mayor of Minneapolis, Minnesota.

Life and career
Ames was born on August 3, 1820, in Colchester, Vermont. His brother was Alfred Elisha Ames. When he was a child, his family moved to Ohio, later relocating to Ottawa, Illinois. While there, he studied law and was admitted to the bar in 1842. He later moved to Hennepin, Illinois, where he served as postmaster and later as a probate judge.

Ames served in the Illinois House of Representatives from 1851 to 1852. After his term in the Illinois General Assembly, he worked as an aide to Joel Aldrich Matteson. In 1855, he was appointed to the American consulate in Hamburg, Germany as consul. While serving as consul, he negotiated a postal treaty with Germany.

In 1857, he arrived in Minneapolis, Minnesota where he started an insurance business. From 1861 to 1864, he served as the secretary of the Minnesota Senate. Later, he served two, one-year terms as the mayor of Minneapolis from 1870 to 1872, defeating his brother Alfred in the second election. In 1873, Ames lost his bid for a third term as mayor. He unsuccessfully ran for the Minneapolis School Board in 1875.

Ames died on February 12, 1897. He was buried in Lakewood Cemetery in Minneapolis.

Electoral history
Minneapolis Mayoral Election, 1870
Eli B. Ames 1,005	
Paris Gibson 782		
Henry G. Sidle 1		
Write-Ins and Scattering 7
Minneapolis Mayoral Election, 1871
Eli B. Ames 1,083	
Alfred Elisha Ames 557
Minneapolis Mayoral Election, 1873
George A. Brackett 2,188
Eli B. Ames 1,362

Notes
Sources note that he was an aide to "Governor Madison", though based on the timing and his location, it appears likely they meant Governor Matteson.
Eli Ames's nephew, A. A. Ames, son of Eli's brother Alfred, served four terms as mayor of Minneapolis between 1876 and 1902.

References

1820 births
1897 deaths
Mayors of Minneapolis
People from Colchester, Vermont
Illinois lawyers
Illinois state court judges
Members of the Illinois House of Representatives
American consuls
Burials at Lakewood Cemetery
People from Hennepin, Illinois
19th-century American politicians
19th-century American judges
19th-century American lawyers